Hugh M. Tiner (April 16, 1908 – January 7, 1981) was an American academic administrator. He served as the second president of Pepperdine University from 1939 to 1957.

Early life
Tiner was born on April 16, 1908, in La Vernia, Texas. He graduated from Abilene Christian College in 1928, and he earned a master's degree from Stanford University in 1929, followed by a PhD from the University of Southern California.

Career
Tiner began his career as a school teacher in Los Angeles, and he later became an assistant superintendent and supervisor.

In 1937, Tiner became the founding dean of George Pepperdine College, which he encouraged his friend George Pepperdine to found in South Los Angeles. As dean, he established the GraPhiC, Pepperdine's student newspaper, in 1937. He also organized the school's first athletic teams (first basketball, then baseball and tennis) and oversaw the selection of the school's colors—blue and orange. He then served as the college's second president from 1939 to 1957. When he was appointed, he was "the youngest college president" in the United States. He was succeeded by M. Norvel Young. He was appointed as a regent in 1977.

Tiner was a minister of the Churches of Christ for the Uptown Church of Christ in Long Beach.

Death
Tiner died on January 7, 1981, in Long Beach, California.

References

Further reading

1908 births
1981 deaths
People from Wilson County, Texas
Abilene Christian University alumni
Stanford University alumni
Presidents of Pepperdine University
20th-century American academics